The 2014 Minnesota Twins season  was the 54th season for the franchise in Minnesota, and the 114th overall in the American League. They were the host team for the 2014 Major League Baseball All-Star Game. They finished last in the AL Central with a 70–92 record.

Spring training
The Twins recorded a 9–16 win–loss record in pre-season spring training, the worst among American League teams. Three of their games finished tied and were therefore not included in the standings.

Regular season

On July 15, the 85th edition of the Mid-Summer Classic returned to the Twin Cities.  Previous All-Star games were held at Metropolitan Stadium (1965) and the Hubert H. Humphrey Metrodome (1984). Twins Glen Perkins and Kurt Suzuki—in his first All-Star appearance—represented the hometown team.  The battery-mates were called into action for the ninth, and closed down the National League All-Stars on nine pitches for a 5–3 AL win. Perkins, a two-time All-Star, earned the save.

On August 20, second baseman Brian Dozier joined the Twins '20/20' club, adding his name to the five others that have connected for twenty homers in the same season they've stolen twenty bases.  The small club includes Larry Hisle (1977), Kirby Puckett (1986), Marty Cordova (1995), Corey Koskie (2001) and Torii Hunter (twice, 2002 and 2004).

The August 24 game against Detroit was the longest Minnesota 9-inning game in history, in terms of time.  The Sunday afternoon game at Target Field ran 4 hours and 10 minutes, and resulted in a 13-4 win for the Tigers.

In the first game of the September 13 doubleheader, starter Phil Hughes set a personal best in striking out eleven Chicago batters before being replaced in the eighth inning. (It had been 379 games since a Twin had posted double-digit strikeouts.)  Michael Tonkin struck out another in the eighth.  The three White Sox pitchers struck out 17 Twins, and the combined total of 29 strikeouts set a Minnesota record for a nine-inning game involving the Twins.

Phil Hughes' contract called for a $500,000 bonus if he reached 210 innings pitched.  On September 24, he pitched 8 innings before an hour-long rain delay.  Ron Gardenhire replaced him with a fresh pitcher when play resumed—and Hughes' inning tally halted at 209⅔.  He declined to be inserted in a later game to achieve one more out.

At season's end, Phil Hughes' strikeout-to-walk ratio (186:16) measured at 11.63 to 1.  That number is the best-ever in the major leagues, topping the previous best of 143:13 set by Bret Saberhagen in 1984.

On September 29, Ron Gardenhire was fired.  In his 13-year tenure as Twins manager he went 1068–1039, for a .507 winning percentage.  The legacy he leaves includes the many memories of him being ejected from a game, enough times to rank in Major League's top ten (but far behind Bobby Cox's recorded 132 times).

Native son Paul Molitor was hired on November 3 to replace Gardenhire, becoming the Twins' thirteenth skipper.  Molitor was born and raised in Saint Paul, attended the University of Minnesota and spent most of his career with the Milwaukee Brewers.  He finished his playing career with three seasons in the 1990s as a Minnesota Twin, and coached and consulted in the organization since retiring.  In 2004, he was voted into the Hall of Fame, so with his hiring he joins the only two other men who've been hired as first-time managers after being inducted in the Hall as players -- Ted Williams and Ryne Sandburg.

Season standings

American League Central

American League Wild Card

Record vs. opponents

Game log

|-  style="text-align:center; background:#fbb;"
| 1 || March 31 || @ White Sox || 3–5 || Sale (1–0) || Nolasco (0–1) || Lindstrom (1) || 37,422 || 0–1
|-  style="text-align:center; background:#fbb;"
| 2 || April 2 || @ White Sox || 6–7 (11) || Belisario (1–0) || Deduno (0–1) || — || 10,625 || 0–2
|-  style="text-align:center; background:#bfb;"
| 3 || April 3 || @ White Sox || 10–9 || Thielbar (1–0) || Lindstrom (0–1) || Perkins (1) || 11,056 || 1–2
|-  style="text-align:center; background:#fbb;"
| 4 || April 4 || @ Indians || 2–7 || Outman (1–0) || Pelfrey (0–1) || — || 41,274 || 1–3
|-  style="text-align:center; background:#bfb;"
| 5 || April 5 || @ Indians || 7–3 || Gibson (1–0) || Carrasco (0–1) || — || 14,153 || 2–3
|-  style="text-align:center; background:#bfb;"
| 6 || April 6 || @ Indians || 10–7 || Swarzak (1–0) || Wood (0–1) || Perkins (2) || 13,104 ||3–3
|-  style="text-align:center; background:#fbb;"
| 7 || April 7 || Athletics || 3–8 || Kazmir (2–0) || Correia (0–1) || — || 35,837 || 3–4
|-  style="text-align:center; background:#fbb;"
| 8 || April 9 || Athletics || 4–7 (11) || Otero (1–0) || Burton (0–1) || — || 22,973 || 3–5
|-  style="text-align:center; background:#fbb;"
| 9 || April 10 || Athletics || 1–6 || Straily (1–1) || Pelfrey (0–2) || — || 20,650 || 3–6
|-  style="text-align:center; background:#cfc;"
| 10 || April 11 || Royals || 10–1 || Gibson (2–0) || Chen (0–1) || — || 24,338 || 4–6
|-  style="text-align:center; background:#cfc;"
| 11 || April 12 || Royals || 7–1 || Nolasco (1–1) || Shields (0–2)|| — || 23,963 || 5–6
|-  style="text-align:center; background:#cfc;"
| 12 || April 13 || Royals || 4–3 || Fien (1–0) || Crow (0–1)|| Perkins (3) || 20,878 || 6–6
|-  style="text-align:center; background:#fbb;"
| 13 || April 15 || Blue Jays || 3–9 || Loup (1–0) || Hughes (0–1) || — || 21,818 || 6–7
|-  style="text-align:center; background:#bbb;"
| — || April 16 || Blue Jays || colspan=8| Postponed (snow).  Makeup date April 17.
|-  style="text-align:center; background:#cfc;"
| 14 || April 17 || Blue Jays || 7–0 || Gibson (3–0) || Dickey (1-3) || — || 20,507 || 7–7
|-  style="text-align:center; background:#cfc;"
| 15 || April 17 || Blue Jays || 9–5 || Fien (2–0) || Santos (0–1) || — || 20,698 || 8–7
|-  style="text-align:center; background:#fbb;"
| 16 || April 18 || @ Royals || 0–5 || Vargas (2–0) || Nolasco (1–2) ||  — || 21,192 || 8–8
|-  style="text-align:center; background:#fbb;"
| 17 || April 19 || @ Royals || 4–5 || Chen (1–1) || Correia (0–2) || Holland (6) || 24,291 || 8–9
|-  style="text-align:center; background:#cfc;"
| 18 || April 20 || @ Royals || 8–3 || Hughes (1–1) || Ventura (1–1) || — || 17,710 || 9–9
|-  style="text-align:center; background:#fbb;"
| 19 || April 22 || @ Rays || 3–7 || Price (3–1) || Gibson (3–1) || — || 11,785 || 9–10
|-  style="text-align:center; background:#cfc;"
| 20 || April 23 || @ Rays || 6–4 (12) || Fien (3–0) || Lueke (0–1) || Perkins (4) || 11,993 || 10–10
|-  style="text-align:center; background:#cfc;"
| 21 || April 24 || @ Rays || 9–7 || Nolasco (2–2) || Bédard (0–1) || Perkins (5) || 13,177 || 11–10
|-  style="text-align:center; background:#fbb;"
| 22 || April 25 || Tigers || 6–10 || Porcello (3–1) || Correia (0–3) || — || 27,558 || 11–11
|-  style="text-align:center; background:#cfc;"
| 23 || April 26 || Tigers || 5–3 || Hughes (2–1) || Ortega (0–1) || Perkins (6) || 28,122 || 12–11
|-  style="text-align:center; background:#bbb;"
| — || April 27 || Tigers || colspan=8| Postponed (rain).  Makeup date August 23.
|-  style="text-align:center; background:#bbb;"
| — || April 29 || Dodgers  || colspan=8| Postponed (rain).  Makeup date May 1.
|-  style="text-align:center; background:#fbb;"
| 24 || April 30 || Dodgers || 4–6 || Greinke (5-0) || Gibson (3–2) || Jansen (10) || 24,588 || 12–12
|-

|-  style="text-align:center; background:#fbb;"
| 25 || May 1 || Dodgers || 4–9 || Haren (4-0) || Pelfrey (0–3) || Perez (1) || 23,306 || 12–13
|-  style="text-align:center; background:#fbb;"
| 26 || May 1 || Dodgers || 3–4 (12) || Wright (2–1) || Duensing (0–1) || Jansen (11) || 24,053 || 12–14
|-  style="text-align:center; background:#fbb;"
| 27 || May 2 || Orioles || 0–3 || Jiménez (1–4) || Nolasco (2–3) || Hunter (8) || 24,165 || 12–15
|-  style="text-align:center; background:#bfb;"
| 28 || May 3 || Orioles || 6–1 || Correia (1–3) || Chen (3–2) ||  || 25,318 || 13–15
|-  style="text-align:center; background:#bfb;"
| 29 || May 4 || Orioles || 5–2 || Hughes (3–1) || González (1–3) || Perkins (7) || 25,559 || 14–15
|-  style="text-align:center; background:#bfb;"
| 30 || May 5 || @ Indians || 1–0 (10) || Thielbar (2–0) || Axford (0–3) || Perkins (8) || 9,037 || 15–15
|-  style="text-align:center; background:#fbb;"
| 31 || May 6 || @ Indians || 2–4 || Tomlin (1–0) || Deduno (0–2) || Shaw (1) || 9,621 || 15–16
|-  style="text-align:center; background:#fbb;"
| 32 || May 7 || @ Indians || 3–4 || Axford (1–3) || Fien (3–1) ||  || 10,742 || 15–17
|-  style="text-align:center; background:#fbb;"
| 33 || May 8 || @ Indians || 4–9 || Masterson (2–1) || Correia (1–4) ||  || 13,095 || 15–18
|-  style="text-align:center; background:#bfb;"
| 34 || May 9 || @ Tigers || 2–1 || Hughes (4–1) || Verlander (4–2) || Perkins (9) || 35,814 || 16–18
|-  style="text-align:center; background:#fbb;"
| 35 || May 10 || @ Tigers || 3–9 || Scherzer (5–1) || Gibson (3–3) ||  || 42,312 || 16–19
|-  style="text-align:center; background:#bfb;"
| 36 || May 11 || @ Tigers || 4–3 || Burton (1–1) || Chamberlain (1–2) || Perkins (10) || 40,468 || 17–19
|-  style="text-align:center; background:#bfb;"
| 37 || May 13 || Red Sox || 8–6 || Perkins (1–0) || Miller (1–1) ||  || 23,949 || 18–19
|-  style="text-align:center; background:#fbb;"
| 38 || May 14 || Red Sox || 4–9 || Doubront (2–3) || Correia (1–5) ||  || 26,802 || 18–20
|-  style="text-align:center; background:#bfb;"
| 39 || May 15 || Red Sox || 4-3 (10) || Duensing (1–1) || Miller (1–2) ||  || 29,628 || 19–20
|-  style="text-align:center; background:#bfb;"
| 40 || May 16 || Mariners || 5–4 || Gibson (4–3) || Young (3–1) || Perkins (11) || 27,275 || 20–20
|-  style="text-align:center; background:#bfb;"
| 41 || May 17 || Mariners || 4–3 || Deduno (1–2) || Elías (3–3) || Perkins (12) || 29,717 || 21–20
|-  style="text-align:center; background:#fbb;"
| 42 || May 18 || Mariners || 2–6 || Hernández (5–1) || Nolasco (2–4)||  || 32,511 || 21–21
|-  style="text-align:center; background:#bfb;"
| 43 || May 20 || @ Padres || 5–3 || Correia (2–5) || Kennedy (2–6) || Perkins (13) || 19,136 || 22–21
|-  style="text-align:center; background:#bfb;"
| 44 || May 21 || @ Padres || 2–0 || Hughes (5–1) || Ross (5–4) || Perkins (14) || 16,079 || 23–21
|-  style="text-align:center; background:#fbb;"
| 45 || May 23 || @ Giants || 2-6 || Lincecum (4-3) || Gibson (4-4) || Machi (2) || 41,514 || 23-22 
|-  style="text-align:center; background:#fbb;"
| 46 || May 24 || @ Giants || 1-2 || Vogelsong (3-2) || Deduno (1-3) || Romo (16) || 41,724 || 23-23
|-  style="text-align:center; background:#fbb;"
| 47 || May 25 || @ Giants || 1-8 || Bumgarner (6-3) || Nolasco (2-5) ||  || 42,590 || 23-24
|-  style="text-align:center; background:#fbb;"
| 48 || May 26 || Rangers || 7-2 || Tepesch (2-0) || Correia (2-6) ||  || 30,571 || 23-25
|-  style="text-align:center; background:#bfb;"
| 49 || May 27 || Rangers || 3-4 || Perkins (2-0) || Soria (1-2) ||  || 22,702 || 24-25
|-  style="text-align:center; background:#fbb;"
| 50 || May 28 || Rangers || 1-0 || Tolleson (1-1) || Burton (1-2) || Soria (9) || 26,472 || 24-26
|-  style="text-align:center; background:#fbb;"
| 51 || May 29 || Rangers || 5-4 || Ogando (2-2) || Fien (3-2) || Soria (10) || 28,170 || 24-27 
|-  style="text-align:center; background:#bfb;"
| 52 || May 30 || @ Yankees || 6-1 || Nolasco (3-5) || Nuño (1-2) ||  || 42,245 || 25-27
|-  style="text-align:center; background:#fbb;"
| 53 || May 31 || @ Yankees || 1-3 || Tanaka (8-1) || Duensing (1-2) || Robertson (12) || 44,346 || 25-28
|-

|-  style="text-align:center; background:#bfb;"
| 54 || June 1 || Yankees || 7-2 || Hughes (6-1) || Robertson (0-2) || – || 42,449 || 26-28
|-  style="text-align:center; background:#fbb;"
| 55 || June 2 || @ Brewers || 2-6 || Garza (3-4) || Gibson (4-5) || – || 28,708 || 26-29
|-  style="text-align:center; background:#bfb;"
| 56 || June 3 || @ Brewers || 6-4 || Deduno (2-3) || Gallardo (3-4) || Perkins (15) || 25,634 || 27-29
|-  style="text-align:center; background:#bfb;"
| 57 || June 4 || Brewers || 6-4 || Nolasco (4-5) || Wooten (1-3) || Perkins (16) || 31,144 || 28-29
|-  style="text-align:center; background:#fbb;"
| 58 || June 5 || Brewers || 5-8 || Peralta (5-5) || Correia (2-7) || Rodriguez (18) || 35,110 || 28-30
|-  style="text-align:center; background:#fbb;"
| 59 || June 6 || Astros || 4-5 || Keuchel (7-3) || Hughes (6-2) || Qualls (7) || 29,948 || 28-31
|-  style="text-align:center; background:#bfb;"
| 60 || June 7 || Astros || 8-0 || Gibson (5-5) || Feldman (3-4) || – || 27,732 || 29-31
|-  style="text-align:center; background:#fbb;"
| 61 || June 8 || Astros || 5-14 || Downs (1-0) || Deduno (2-4) || – || 31,576 || 29-32
|-  style="text-align:center; background:#fbb;"
| 62 || June 9 || @ Blue Jays || 4-5 || Janssen (1-0) || Guerrier (0-1) || – || 19,428 || 29-33
|-  style="text-align:center; background:#bfb;"
| 63 || June 10 || @ Blue Jays || 4-0 || Correia (3-7) || Happ (5-3) || – || 20,681 || 30-33
|-  style="text-align:center; background:#bfb;"
| 64 || June 11 || @ Blue Jays || 7-2 || Hughes (7-2) || Stroman (3-1) || – || 45,080 || 31-33
|-  style="text-align:center; background:#bfb;"
| 65 || June 13 || @ Tigers || 2-0 || Gibson (6-5) || Smyly (3-5) || Perkins (17) || 39,811 || 32-33
|-  style="text-align:center; background:#fbb;"
| 66 || June 14 || @ Tigers || 9-12 || Sánchez (3-2) || Deduno (2-5) || Krol (1) || 41,498 || 32-34
|-  style="text-align:center; background:#fbb;"
| 67 || June 15 || @ Tigers || 3-4 || Nathan (3-2) || Fien (3-3) || – || 41,462 || 32-35
|-  style="text-align:center; background:#fbb;"
| 68 || June 16 || @ Red Sox || 0-1 || De La Rosa (2-2) || Correia (3-8) || Uehara (15) || 35,693 || 32-36
|-  style="text-align:center; background:#fbb;"
| 69 || June 17 || @ Red Sox || 1-2 || Lester (8-7) || Hughes (7-3) || Mujica (2) || 36,835 || 32-37
|-  style="text-align:center; background:#fbb;"
| 70 || June 18 || @ Red Sox || 1-2 (10) || Uehara (2-1) || Fien (3-4) || – || 36,489 || 32-38
|-  style="text-align:center; background:#bfb;"
| 71 || June 19 || White Sox || 4-2 || Fien (4-4) || Petricka (0-2) || Perkins (18) || 31,195 || 33-38
|-  style="text-align:center; background:#bfb;"
| 72 || June 20 || White Sox || 5-4 || Perkins (3-0) || Webb (4-1) || – || 32,071 || 34-38
|-  style="text-align:center; background:#bfb;"
| 73 || June 21 || White Sox || 4-3 || Correia (4-8) || Rienzo (4-5) || Perkins (19) || 32,647 || 35-38
|-  style="text-align:center; background:#bfb;"
| 74 || June 22 || White Sox || 6-5 || Hughes (8-3) || Danks (6-6) || Burton (1) || 30,491 || 36-38
|-  style="text-align:center; background:#fbb;"
| 75 || June 24 || @ Angels || 6-8 || Wilson (8-6) || Gibson (6-6) || Smith (6) || 37,086 || 36-39
|-  style="text-align:center; background:#fbb;"
| 76 || June 25 || @ Angels || 2-6 || Richards (8-2) || Pino (0-1) || – || 39,082 || 36-40
|-  style="text-align:center; background:#fbb;"
| 77 || June 26 || @ Angels || 4-6 || Weaver (8-6) || Nolasco (4-6) || Smith (7) || 32,209 || 36-41
|-  style="text-align:center; background:#fbb;"
| 78 || June 27 || @ Rangers || 4-5 || Tepesch (3-3) || Correia (4-9) || – || 38,111 || 36-42
|-  style="text-align:center; background:#fbb;"
| 79 || June 28 || @ Rangers || 0-5 || Darvish (8-4) || Hughes (8-4) || – || 30,620 || 36-43
|-  style="text-align:center; background:#bfb;"
| 80 || June 29 || @ Rangers || 3-2 || Gibson (7-6) || Soria (1-3) || Perkins (20) || 36,779 || 37-43
|-  style="text-align:center; background:#fbb;"
| 81 || June 30 || Royals || 1-6 || Duffy (5-7) || Pino (0-2) || – || 28,533 || 37-44
|-

|-  style="text-align:center; background:#bfb;" 
| 82 || July 1 || Royals || 10-2 || Nolasco (5-6) || Shields (8-4) || – || 23,383 || 38-44
|-  style="text-align:center; background:#fbb;"
| 83 || July 2 || Royals || 0-4  || Vargas (8-3) || Correia (4-10)  || – || 28,860 || 38-45 
|-  style="text-align:center; background:#fbb;"
| 84 || July 3 || Yankees || 4-7  || Tanaka (12-3) || Hughes (8-5) || Robertson (19) || 34,714 || 38-46
|-  style="text-align:center; background:#fbb;"
| 85 || July 4 || Yankees || 5-6  || Huff (2-0) || Gibson (7-7) || Robertson (20) || 36,952 || 38-47
|-  style="text-align:center; background:#bfb;"
| 86 || July 5 || Yankees || 2-1 (11) || Duensing (2-2) || Thornton (0-2) || – || 36,514 || 39-47
|-  style="text-align:center; background:#fbb;"
| 87 || July 6 || Yankees || 7-9 || Kuroda (6-6) || Nolasco (5-7) || Robertson (21) || 31,171 || 39-48
|-  style="text-align:center; background:#fbb;"
| 88 || July 7 || @ Mariners || 0-2  || Iwakuma (7-4) || Correia (4-11) || Rodney (26) || 18,562 || 39-49
|-  style="text-align:center; background:#bfb;"
| 89 || July 8 || @ Mariners || 2-0 || Hughes (9-5) || Young (8-5) || Perkins (21) || 15,553 || 40-49
|-  style="text-align:center; background:#bfb;"
| 90 || July 9 || @ Mariners || 8-1 || Gibson (8-7) || Elias (7-8) || – || 16,460 || 41-49
|-  style="text-align:center; background:#bfb;"
| 91 || July 10 || @ Mariners || 4-2  || Pino (1-2) || Wilhelmsen (1-2) || Perkins (22) || 14,530 || 42-49
|-  style="text-align:center; background:#fbb;"
| 92 || July 11 || @ Rockies || 2-6  || de la Rosa (10-6) || Johnson (0-1) || – || 36,110 || 42-50
|-  style="text-align:center; background:#bfb;"
| 93 || July 12 || @ Rockies || 9-3 || Correia (5-11) || Matzek (1-4) || – || 35,930 || 43-50
|-  style="text-align:center; background:#bfb;"
| 94 || July 13 || @ Rockies || 13-5 || Hughes (10-5) || Anderson (0-3) || – || 35,743 || 44-50
|-  style="background:#bbb;"
|colspan=9| All–Star Break (July 14–17)
|-  style="text-align:center; background:#fbb;"
| 95 || July 18 || Rays || 2-6 || Cobb (5-6) || Gibson (8-8)  || – || 31,058 || 44-51
|-  style="text-align:center; background:#fbb;"
| 96 || July 19 || Rays || 1-5 || Price (10-7) || Hughes (10-6) || McGee (8) || 36,117 || 44-52
|-  style="text-align:center; background:#fbb;"
| 97 || July 20 || Rays || 3-5 || Archer (6-5) || Correia (5-12) || Yates (1) || 26,821 || 44-53
|-  style="text-align:center; background:#bfb;"
| 98 || July 21 || Indians || 4-3 || Fien (5-4) || Shaw (4-2) || Perkins (23) || 25,109 || 45-53
|-  style="text-align:center; background:#fbb;"
| 99 || July 22 || Indians || 2-8 || Salazar (2-4) || Pino (1-3) || – || 28,291 || 45-54
|-  style="text-align:center; background:#bfb;"
| 100 || July 23 || Indians || 3-1 || Swarzak (2-0) || Bauer (4-5) || Perkins (24) || 34,608 || 46-54
|-  style="text-align:center; background:#fbb;"
| 101 || July 24 || White Sox || 2-5 || Noesí (5-7) || Hughes (10-7) || Petricka (5) || 32,952 || 46-55
|-  style="text-align:center; background:#fbb;"
| 102 || July 25 || White Sox || 5-9 || Danks (9-6) || Correia (5-13) || – || 28,728 || 46-56
|-  style="text-align:center; background:#fbb;"
| 103 || July 26 || White Sox || 0-7 || Sale (10-1) || Darnell (0-1) || – || 33,005 || 46-57
|-  style="text-align:center; background:#bfb;"
| 104 || July 27 || White Sox || 4-3 || Burton (2-2) || Belisario (3-7) || Perkins (25) || 27,818 || 47-57
|-  style="text-align:center; background:#bfb;"
| 105 || July 29 || @ Royals || 2-1 || Gibson (9-8) || Shields (9-6) || Perkins (26) || 30,686 || 48-57
|-  style="text-align:center; background:#fbb;"
| 106 || July 30 || @ Royals || 2-3 || Frasor (2-1) || Hughes (10-8) || Holland (28) || 20,747 || 48-58
|-  style="text-align:center; background:#fbb;"
| 107 || July 31 || @ Royals || 3-6 || Ventura (8-8) || Thielbar (2-1) || Holland (29) || 24,127 || 48-59
|-

|-  style="text-align:center; background:#fbb;"
| 108 || August 1 || @ White Sox || 8–10 || Guerra (1-2) || Fien (5-5) || Petricka (7) || 28,060 || 48–60
|-  style="text-align:center; background:#bfb;"
| 109 || August 2 || @ White Sox || 8–6 || Pressly (1-0) || Belisario (4-8) || Perkins (27) || 27,446 || 49–60
|-  style="text-align:center; background:#bfb;"
| 110 || August 3 || @ White Sox || 16–3 || Gibson (10-8) || Guerra (1-3) || – || 23,471 || 50–60
|-  style="text-align:center; background:#bfb;"
| 111 || August 5 || Padres || 3–1 || Hughes (11-8) || Hahn (7-3) || Perkins (28) || 34,495 || 51–60
|-  style="text-align:center; background:#fbb;"
| 112 || August 6 || Padres || 4–5 (10) || Quackenbush (2-2) || Swarzak (2-1) || Benoit (4) || 34,567 || 51–61
|-  style="text-align:center; background:#fbb;"
| 113 || August 7 || @ Athletics || 0–3 || Lester (12-7) || Pino (1-4) || – || 22,108 || 51–62
|-  style="text-align:center; background:#fbb;"
| 114 || August 8 || @ Athletics || 5–6 || Kazmir (13-4) || Gibson (10-9) || Doolittle (18) || 20,196 || 51–63
|-  style="text-align:center; background:#fbb;"
| 115 || August 9 || @ Athletics || 4–9 || Samardzija (5-8) || May (0-1) || – || 32,074 || 51–64
|-  style="text-align:center; background:#bfb;"
| 116 || August 10 || @ Athletics || 6–1 || Hughes (12-8) || Gregerson (2-2) || – || 25,598 || 52–64
|-  style="text-align:center; background:#bfb;"
| 117 || August 11 || @ Astros || 4–2 || Duensing (3-2) || Fields (2-5) || Perkins (29) || 15,569 || 53–64
|-  style="text-align:center; background:#fbb;"
| 118 || August 12 || @ Astros || 4–10 || McHugh (5-9) || Pino (1-5) || – || 17,490 || 53–65
|-  style="text-align:center; background:#bfb;"
| 119 || August 13 || @ Astros || 3–1 || Gibson (11-9)  || Oberholtzer (4-8) || Perkins (30) || 16,480 || 54–65
|-  style="text-align:center; background:#fbb;"
| 120 || August 15 || Royals || 5–6 || Duffy (8-10) || Nolasco (5-8) || Holland (37) || 32,013 || 54–66
|-  style="text-align:center; background:#bfb;"
| 121 || August 16 || Royals || 4–1 || Hughes (13-8) || Ventura (9-9) || Perkins (31) || 35,575 || 55–66
|-  style="text-align:center; background:#fbb;"
| 122 || August 17 || Royals || 6–12 || Guthrie (9-10) || Milone (6-4) || – || 31,455 || 55–67
|-  style="text-align:center; background:#fbb;"
| 123 || August 18 || Royals || 4–6 || Vargas (10-5) || May (0-2) || Holland (38) || 25,559 || 55–68
|-  style="text-align:center; background:#fbb;"
| 124 || August 19 || Indians || 5–7 || Crockett (3-0) || Duensing (3-3) || Allen (16) || 26,358 || 55–69
|-  style="text-align:center; background:#fbb;"
| 125 || August 20 || Indians || 0–5 || House (2-3) || Nolasco (5-9) || – || 28,943 || 55–70
|-  style="text-align:center; background:#bfb;"
| 126 || August 21 || Indians || 4–1 || Hughes (14-8) || Kluber (13-7) || Perkins (32) || 28,033 || 56–70
|-  style="text-align:center; background:#bfb;"
| 127 || August 22 || Tigers || 20–6 || Pressly (2-0) || Ray (1-4) || – || 29,394 || 57–70
|-  style="text-align:center; background:#bfb;"
| 128 || August 23 || Tigers || 12–4 || Pino (2-5) || Farmer (0-1) || – || 25,110 || 58–70
|-  style="text-align:center; background:#fbb;"
| 129 || August 23 || Tigers || 6–8 || Verlander (11-11) || May (0-3) || Nathan (27) || 25,578 || 58–71
|-  style="text-align:center; background:#fbb;"
| 130 || August 24 || Tigers || 4–13 || Scherzer (15-4) || Gibson (11-10) || – || 23,983 || 58–72
|-  style="text-align:center; background:#fbb;"
| 131 || August 26 || @ Royals || 1–2 || Davis (7-2) || Perkins (3-1) || – || 13,847 || 58–73
|-  style="text-align:center; background:#fbb;"
| 132 || August 27 || @ Royals || 1–6 || Davis (8-2) || Hughes (14-9) || – || 17,668 || 58–74
|-  style="text-align:center; background:#bfb;"
| 133 || August 28 || @ Royals || 11–5 (10) || Swarzak (3-1) || Chen (2-4) || – || 17,219 || 59–74
|-  style="text-align:center; background:#fbb;"
| 134 || August 29 || @ Orioles || 1–9 || González (7-7) || May (0-4) || – || 27,464 || 59–75
|-  style="text-align:center; background:#fbb;"
| 135 || August 30 || @ Orioles || 2–3 || Miller (5-5) || Burton (2-3) || Britton (30) || 30,322 || 59–76
|-  style="text-align:center; background:#fbb;"
| 136 || August 31 || @ Orioles || 8–12 || Chen (14-4) || Nolasco (5-10) || Britton (31) || 40,905 || 59–77
|-

|-  style="text-align:center; background:#bfb;"
| 137 || September 1 || @ Orioles || 6–4 || Hughes (15-9) || Gausman (7-7) || Perkins (33) || 33,156 || 60–77
|-  style="text-align:center; background:#fbb;"
| 138 || September 2 || White Sox || 3–6 (10) || Webb (6-4) || Oliveros (0-1) || Petricka (11) || 23,719 || 60–78
|-  style="text-align:center; background:#bfb;"
| 139 || September 3 || White Sox || 11–4 || May (1-4) || Danks (9-10) || – || 21,778 || 61–78
|-  style="text-align:center; background:#fbb;"
| 140 || September 4 || Angels || 4–5 || Smith (6-2) || Perkins (3-2) || Street (36) || 21,914 || 61–79
|-  style="text-align:center; background:#fbb;"
| 141 || September 5 || Angels || 6–7 (10) || Street (2-1) || Burton (2-4) || Jepsen (2) || 23,477 || 61–80
|-  style="text-align:center; background:#fbb;"
| 142 || September 6 || Angels || 5–8 || Smith (7-2) || Burton (2-5) || Street (37) || 28,924 || 61–81
|-  style="text-align:center; background:#fbb;"
| 143 || September 7 || Angels || 4–14 || Wilson (11-9) || Darnell (0-2) || – || 25,419 || 61–82
|-  style="text-align:center; background:#bfb;"
| 144 || September 9 || @ Indians || 4–3 || May (2-4) || Bauer (5-8) || Burton (2) || 9,489 || 62–82
|-  style="text-align:center; background:#bbb;”
| – || September 10 || @ Indians || colspan=8| Postponed (rain).  Makeup date September 11.
|-  style="text-align:center; background:#fbb;”
| 145 || September 11 || @ Indians || 2–8 || Kluber (15–9) || Gibson (11–11) || — || N/A || 62–83
|-  style="text-align:center; background:#fbb;”
| 146 || September 11 || @ Indians || 0–2 || House (3-3) || Nolasco (5–11) || Allen (20) || 12,637 || 62–84
|-  style="text-align:center; background:#bbb;”
| 147 || September 12 || @ White Sox || colspan=8| Postponed (rain).  Makeup date September 13.
|-  style="text-align:center; background:#fbb;”
| 147 || September 13 || @ White Sox || 1–5 || Quintana (8–10) || Hughes (15–10) || — || N/A || 62–85
|-  style="text-align:center; background:#fbb;”
| 148 || September 13 || @ White Sox ||  6–7 || Petricka (1–4) || Perkins (3–3) || – || 20,106 ||  62–86
|-  style="text-align:center; background:#bfb;”
| 149 || September 14 || @ White Sox || 6–4 || May (3–4) || Noesí (8–10) || Perkins (34) || 17,044 || 63–86
|-  style="text-align:center; background:#fbb;”
| 150 || September 15 || Tigers ||| 6–8 || Ryan (2–0) || Fien (5–6) || Soria (18) || 19,700 || 63–87
|-  style="text-align:center; background:#bfb;”
| 151 || September 16 || Tigers || 4–3 || Perkins (4–3) ||  Nathan (4–4) || – || 22,066 || 64–87
|-  style="text-align:center; background:#bfb;”
| 152 || September 17 || Tigers || 8–4 || Gibson (12–11) || Price (14–12) || – || 22,285 || 65–87
|-  style="text-align:center; background:#bfb;”
| 153 || September 19 || Indians || 5–4 || Burton (3–5) || Crockett (4–1) || — || 28,400 || 66–87
|-  style="text-align:center; background:#fbb;”
| 154 || September 20 || Indians || 3–7 || House (4–3) || May (3–5) || Rzepczynski (1) || 28,316 || 66–88
|-  style="text-align:center; background:#fbb;”
| 155 || September 21 || Indians || 2–7 || Kluber (17–9) || Swarzak (3–2) || — || 24,451 || 66–89
|-  style="text-align:center; background:#fbb;”
| 156 || September 22 || Diamondbacks || 2–6 || Collmenter (11–8) || Nolasco (5–12) || — || 22,571 || 66–90
|-  style="text-align:center; background:#bfb;”
| 157 || September 23 || Diamondbacks || 6–3 || Gibson (13–11) || Chafin (0–1) || — || 28,902 || 67–90
|-  style="text-align:center; background:#bfb;”
| 158 || September 24 || Diamondbacks || 2–1 || Hughes (16–10) || Nuño (0–1) || Burton (3) || 29,445 || 68–90
|-  style="text-align:center; background:#fbb;”
| 159 || September 25 || @ Tigers || 2–4 || Scherzer (18–5) || May (3–6) || Nathan (34) || 33,077 || 68–91
|-  style="text-align:center; background:#bfb;”
| 160 || September 26 || @ Tigers || 11–4 || Achter (1–0) || Porcello (15–13) || — || 35,178 || 69–91
|-  style="text-align:center; background:#bfb;”
| 161 || September 27 || @ Tigers || 12–3 || Nolasco (6–12) || Lobstein (1–2) || — || 38,805 || 70–91
|-  style="text-align:center; background:#fbb;”
| 162 || September 28 || @ Tigers || 3–0 || Price (15–12) || Gibson (13–12) || Nathan (35) || 40,501 || 70–92
|-

Roster

Player stats
All stats updated through September 28, 2013.

All batting and pitching leaders in each category are in bold.

Batting
Note: G = Games played; AB = At bats; R = Runs scored; H = Hits; 2B = Doubles; 3B = Triples; HR = Home runs; RBI = Runs batted in; AVG = Batting average; SB = Stolen bases

Pitching
Note: W = Wins; L = Losses; ERA = Earned run average; G = Games pitched; GS = Games started; SV = Saves; IP = Innings pitched; R = Runs allowed; ER = Earned runs allowed; BB = Walks allowed; K = Strikeouts

Other post-season awards
Calvin R. Griffith Award (Most Valuable Twin) – Phil Hughes
Joseph W. Haynes Award (Twins Pitcher of the Year) – Phil Hughes
Bill Boni Award (Twins Outstanding Rookie) – Danny Santana
Charles O. Johnson Award (Most Improved Twin) – Eduardo Escobar
Jim Kaat Award (Defensive Player of the Year) – Brian Dozier
Dick Siebert Award (Upper Midwest Player of the Year) – Pat Neshek
Bob Allison Award (Leadership Award) – Kurt Suzuki
Mike Augustin Award ("Media Good Guy" Award) – Ron Gardenhire
The above awards are voted on by the Twin Cities chapter of the BBWAA
Carl R. Pohlad Award (Outstanding Community Service) – Brian Duensing
Sherry Robertson Award (Twins Outstanding Farm System Position Player) – Kennys Vargas
Jim Rantz Award (Twins Outstanding Farm System Pitcher) – José Berríos
Kirby Puckett Award (Alumni Community Service) – Jim Kaat
Herb Carneal Award (Lifetime Achievement Award) – none

Farm system 

LEAGUE CHAMPIONS: Fort Myers

References

External links
2014 Minnesota Twins at Baseball Reference

Minnesota Twins seasons
Minnesota Twins
Minnesota Twins